The Trip to Spain is a 2017 British comedy film directed by Michael Winterbottom. It is the third installment of Winterbottom's film adaptations of the TV series The Trip, following The Trip (2011) and The Trip to Italy (2014). The film stars Steve Coogan and Rob Brydon as fictionalized versions of themselves continuing their culinary travels away from home. It was released on 11 August 2017.

Premise 
Steve convinces Rob to go on a road trip through Cantabria, the Basque region, Aragon, La Rioja, Castile, La Mancha and Andalucia, retracing the journey Steve took as a young man. On their journey the pair discuss history, fame, and fatherhood.

Cast 
 Steve Coogan as himself
 Rob Brydon as himself
 Claire Keelan as Emma
 Marta Barrio as Yolanda
 Kyle Soller as Jonathon
 Margo Stilley as Mischa

Reception 
On review aggregator Rotten Tomatoes, the film has an approval rating of 83% based on 77 reviews, with an average rating of 7.0/10. The site's critical consensus reads, "The Trip to Spain offers more of the same scenery, food, and conversation that filled Steve Coogan and Rob Brydon's first two Trips -- which is to say, more of a good thing." On Metacritic, the film has a weighted average score of 66 out of 100, based on 31 critics, indicating "generally favorable reviews.

Joshua Rothkopf of Time Out New York gave the film three out of five stars and David Ehrlich of IndieWire a B+ rating.  Stephanie Zacarek of Time praised the film, saying "When you come to a Trip picture, you know you’ll be getting more of the same: These movies are reliable quantities in an unreliable world".

References

External links 
 
 
 

2017 films
Films set in Spain
Films shot in Spain
Films directed by Michael Winterbottom
British buddy films
British road comedy-drama films
Films about actors
Films about comedians
2010s road movies
Films edited from television programs
2010s English-language films
2010s British films